The Pesa Jazz is a family of low floor, articulated and multiple carriage trams by Pesa SA which have been manufactured since 2013. The trams are currently serving the cities of Gdańsk and Warsaw.

History 
The Pesa Jazz family is the successor to the previous families of trams. The tram was designed for use in Warsaw. Comparing the Jazz to its predecessor, the 120N, it has a slightly shorter length, non-axle trucks and greater energy storage (enabling movement for about  without power). On 21 March 2013, an agreement was signed, leading to 45 128N trams being supplied to Warsaw. Later in the same year, on 25 September, an agreement was signed that led to 5 128NG trams being supplied to Gdańsk. Warsaw later signed another agreement, which led to 30 more trams being supplied.

References

External links

Jazz